Nathaniel Mather  (1631 – 1697) was an Independent minister.

Biography

Nathaniel Mather was born at Much Woolton, near Liverpool, Lancashire, on 20 March 1631, as the second son of Richard Mather. In 1635 his father took him to New England, where he graduated M.A. at Harvard College in 1647. He finished his studies in England, probably returning with his brother Samuel in 1650.

Mather was assistant to George Mortimer (died 1688) at Harberton, Devonshire (a Parliamentary sequestered vicarage), and succeeded him there in 1655. In 1656 he was presented by the Lord Protector Oliver Cromwell to the sequestered vicarage of Barnstaple, Devonshire, in which the vicar, Martin Blake (1593–1673), B.D., was reinstated at the Restoration.

After the Restoration, Mather then went over to Holland, and for some years was pastor of the English Church at Rotterdam. On the death of his brother Samuel, he succeeded him (1671) as minister at New Row, Dublin. In 1688, the year of the Glorious Revolution, he left Ireland, and became pastor of the independent church in Paved Alley, Lime Street, London, vacant by the death of John Collins (1632?–1687).

Mather joined the "Happy Union" of 1691, but was a leader in its disruption owing to the alleged heresies of Daniel Williams (1643?–1716), D.D. On the withdrawal of William Bates (1625–1699), D.D. (who sided with Williams), from the Pinners' Hall lectureship, Mather was appointed (1694) in his place. 

He died on 26 July 1697, and was buried at Bunhill Fields, where a long Latin inscription was placed upon his tombstone. A still longer Latin epitaph is in Isaac Watts's Lyric Poems. He was of tall stature.

Works
He published:
 The Righteousness of God through Faith, etc., Oxford, 1694, 4to (his first lectures at Pinners' Hall).
Posthumous were:
 The Lawfulness of a Pastor's acting in other Churches, etc., 1698, 12mo.
 Twenty-three select Sermons … at Pinners' Hall, etc., 1701, 8vo.

Family
On 2 August 1655 Nathaniel Mather married Mary Benn, the daughter of the Revd. William Benn of Dorchester, England at St Andrew Undershaft, City of London.  They had one child who died in infancy in 1660.  Mary died about 1706.

Notes

References
 
 
 
 

Attribution
  Endnotes:
 Calamy's Account, 1713, p. 238;
 Calamy's Continuation, 1727, i. 257 sq.;
 Walker's Sufferings of the Clergy, 1714, ii. 196, 216;
 Wilson's Dissenting Churches of London, 1808, i. 231;
 Armstrong's Appendix to Martineau's Ordination Service, 1829, p. 80.

Further reading

.

 

1631 births
1697 deaths
People from Woolton
Harvard University alumni
17th-century American people
Massachusetts colonial-era clergy
Burials at Bunhill Fields
Irish Presbyterian ministers
Clergy from Liverpool